Calsyntenin-1 is a protein that in humans is encoded by the CLSTN1 gene.

Clinical relevance 

Mutations in this gene have been shown associated to pathogenic mechanisms of Alzheimer's disease.

Interactions 

CLSTN1 has been shown to interact with APBA2 and Amyloid precursor protein.

References

External links

Further reading